Let Me may refer to:

"Let Me" (Elvis Presley song), 1956
"Let Me" (Paul Revere & the Raiders song), 1969
"Let Me" (Pat Green song), 2008
"Let Me" (Zayn song), 2018
"Let Me", a 2014 song by Earshot
"Let Me", a song by Rihanna from the 2005 album Music of the Sun